Vrsar is a small seaside town and a municipality in Istria, Croatia located 9 kilometers south of Poreč. The historical center is located on top of a hill, including the St. Martin parish church and the 40-meter high bell tower. In the 20th century, the town expanded down the hill, into the surrounding area. It is a popular summer destination with large campsites, private accommodation units and a modern marina.
It is the home of the large Koversada Naturist Campsite, the oldest in Istria.

Municipality
The municipality consists of Vrsar as the largest settlement and 8 villages in the interior, including Begi, Bralići, Delići, Flengi, Gradina, Kloštar, Kontešići and Marasi. Funtana, the nearby coastal town, was a part of the Vrsar municipality until 2006. Town council has 11 representatives elected every four years. Local government is based in a refurbished historical building in the central Degrassi Square.

History
Vrsar was part of the Republic of Venice (1420-1797), then of the French Kingdom of Italy firstly, and Illyrian Provinces till 1814. After the fall of Napoleon, it was part of the Austrian Littoral up to 1915 then became part of Kingdom of Italy (1918–1947) after which it was part of Yugoslavia until 1991 when incorporated in the Republic of Croatia.

Koversada
Koversada Naturist Park is 2 kilometres south of Vrsar. It has over 1100  camping emplacements, 350 with their own water and 600 with internet connections. It is situated in ninety hectares of olive groves on the shore and on a tiny island. It is linked to the town by a tourist train.

References

Municipalities of Croatia
Populated places in Istria County
Italian-speaking territorial units in Croatia